Austin 2200 may refer to one of the following two automobiles:

 Austin 2200, a version of the BMC ADO17
 Austin 2200 HL, a version of the Princess

2200